Events from the year 1948 in Sweden

Incumbents
 Monarch – Gustaf V
 Prime Minister – Tage Erlander

Events
Easter – Youth riots in Stockholm
Summer – Violence against Romani people in Jönköping
19 September – Swedish general election

Popular culture

Literature
Pippi in the South Seas, children's book by Astrid Lindgren

Film
Banketten, drama film directed by Hasse Ekman

Births

26 January – Hasse Andersson, singer and songwriter
23 March – Lena Conradson, singer
5 April – Dan Söderström, ice-hockey player
21 April – Jessica Iwanson, choreographer
26 April – Svante Lindqvist, historian
5 May – Mats Bergman, actor
5 May – Anna Bergman, actress
4 July – Tommy Körberg, actor and musician
4 September – Anders Åberg, actor
11 October – Göran Rosenberg, journalist
25 October – Ingrid Sundberg, alpine skier.
30 October – Ines Uusmann, politician
22 November – Lars Andersson, sprint canoer.

Exact date missing
Birgitta Eriksson, politician

Deaths
21 March – Gustaf Elgenstierna, historian and genealogist (born 1871)
12 October – Emilie Rathou, temperance and women's rights activist (born 1862)

References

 
Sweden
Years of the 20th century in Sweden